The history of Bihar is one of the most varied in India. Bihar consists of three distinct regions, each has its own distinct history and culture. They are Magadh, Mithila and Bhojpur.
Chirand, on the northern bank of the Ganga River, in Saran district, has an archaeological record from the Neolithic age (about 2500–1345BC). Regions of Bihar—such as Magadha, Mithila and Anga—are mentioned in religious texts and epics of ancient India. Mithila is believed to be the centre of Indian power in the Later Vedic period (c. 1100-500 BCE). Mithila first gained prominence after the establishment of the Videha kingdom. The Kings of the Videha Kingdom were called Janakas. A daughter of one of the Janaks of Mithila, Sita, is mentioned as consort of Lord Rama in the Hindu epic Ramayana, written by Valmiki. The Videha Kingdom later became incorporated into the Vajjika League which had its capital in the city of Vaishali, which is also in Mithila.

Magadha, another region of Bihar was the centre of Indian power, learning and culture for about a thousand years. One of India's greatest empires, the Maurya empire, as well as two major pacifist religions, Buddhism and Jainism, arose from the region that is now Bihar. Magadha empires, most notably the Maurya and Gupta empires, unified large parts of the Indian subcontinent under their rule. Their capital Pataliputra, adjacent to modern-day Patna, was an important political, military and economic centre of Indian civilisation during the ancient and classical periods of Indian history. Many ancient Indian texts, aside from religious epics, were written in ancient Bihar. The play Abhijñānaśākuntala was the most prominent.

The present-day region of Bihar overlaps with several pre-Mauryan kingdoms and republics, including Magadha, Anga and the Vajjika League of Mithila. The latter was one of the world's earliest known republics and had existed in the region since before the birth of Mahavira (c. 599 BCE). The classical Gupta dynasty of Bihar presided over a period of cultural flourishing and learning, known today as the Golden Age of India.

The Pala Empire also made their capital at Pataliputra once during Devapala's rule. After the Pala period, Bihar played a very small role in Indian history until the emergence of the Suri dynasty during the Medieval period in the 1540s. After the fall of the Suri dynasty in 1556, Bihar again became a marginal player in India and was the staging post for the British colonial Bengal Presidency from the 1750s and up to the war of 1857–58. On 22 March 1912, Bihar was carved out as a separate province in the British Indian Empire. Since 1947 independence, Bihar has been an original state of the Indian Union.

Neolithic (10,800–3300 BC) 

The earliest proof of human activity in Bihar is Mesolithic habitational remains at Munger.

Prehistoric rock paintings have been discovered in the hills of Kaimur, Nawada and Jamui. It was the first time that a Neolithic settlement was discovered in the thick of the alluvium, over the bank of the Ganges at Chirand. The rock paintings depict a prehistoric lifestyle and natural environment. They depict the sun, the moon, stars, animals, plants, trees, and rivers, and it is speculated that they represent love for nature. The paintings also highlight the daily life of the early humans in Bihar, including activities like hunting, running, dancing and walking. The rock paintings in Bihar are not only identical to those in central and southern India but are also akin to those in Europe and Africa. The rock paintings of Spain's Alta Mira and France's Lascaux are almost identical to those found in Bihar.

Bronze Age (3300–1300 BC)

Parallel to Indus Valley Civilization 
In 2017 bricks dated to mature Harappan period were discovered from the outskirts of the ancient city of Vaishali. Any in depth research which may establish definite links between Indus Valley Civilization and Bihar is yet to be conducted. A round seal excavated from Vaishali dated 200 BC-200 AD has three inscribed letters which according to Indus Valley Civilization scholar Iravatham Mahadevan represents formulas inscribed on the Indus seals and dates it to the earliest layers of excavation i-e 1100 BC.

Rigvedic period 
Kikata was an ancient kingdom in what is now India, mentioned in the Vedas. Some scholars have believed that they were the forefathers of Magadhas because Kikata is used as synonym for Magadha in the later texts. It probably lay to the south of Magadha Kingdom in a hilly landscape. A section in the Rigveda (RV 3.53.14) refers to the s (Hindi:कीकट), a tribe which most scholars have placed in present-day south western Bihar (Magadha) such as Weber and Zimmer while some scholars such as Oldenburg and Hillebrandt dispute that. According to Puranic literature Kikata is placed near Gaya. It is described as extending from Caran-adri to Gridharakuta (vulture peak), Rajgir. Some scholar such as A. N. Chandra place Kikata in a hilly part of Indus valley based on argument that countries between magadh and indus valley are not mentioned such as kuru, kosala etc. The leader of Kikatas has been called Pramaganda, a usurer. It is unclear whether Kikatas were already present in Magadh during rigvedic period or they migrated there later. Like Rigveda attributes of Kikatas, Atharvaveda also speaks about south eastern tribes like Magadhas and Angas as hostile tribe who lived on the borders of Brahmanical India. Bhagvata Purana mentions about the birth of Buddha among Kikatas.  

Some scholars have placed the Kīkaṭa kingdom, mentioned in the Rigveda, in Bihar (Magadha) because Kikata is used as synonym for Magadha in the later texts; however, according to Michael Witzel, Kīkaṭa was situated south of Kurukshetra in eastern Rajasthan or western Madhya Pradesh. The placement in Bihar is also challenged by historical geographers Mithila Sharan Pandey (who argues they must have been near Western Uttar Pradesh), and O.P. Bharadwaj (who places them near the Sarasvati River), and historian Ram Sharan Sharma, who believes they were probably in Haryana.

Northern black polished ware 
Urbanization in the gangetic plains began with the appearance of Northern black polished ware period and archaeologists trace the origin of this pottery in Magadh region of Bihar. The oldest dated site of NBWP is in Juafardih, Nalanda, which is carbon dated to 1200 BC.

Iron Age  (1500–200 BC)

Late Vedic Kingdoms

Anga Kingdom
Anga kingdom is described in the Mahabharata. Karna, a friend of Duryodhana, was the king of Anga.

Videha (Mithila) Kingdom
Videha is mentioned in both the Ramayana and the Mahabharata as comprising parts of Bihar and extending into small parts of Nepal. The Hindu goddess Sita is described as the princess of Videha, daughter of Raja Janak. The capital of Videha is believed to be either Janakpur (in Present-day Nepal), or Baliraajgadh (in Present-day Madhubani district, Bihar, India).

Magadha Kingdom 

The Magadha was established by semi-mythical king Jarasandha, who the Puranas state was a king of the Brihadrathas dynasty and one of the descendants of King Puru. Jarasandha appears in the Mahabharatha as the "Magadhan Emperor who rules all India" and meets with an unceremonious ending. Jarasandha was the greatest among them during epic times. His capital, Rajagriha or Rajgir, is now a modern hill resort in Bihar. Jarasandha's continuous assault on the Yadava kingdom of Surasena resulted in their withdrawal from central India to western India. Jarasandha was a threat not only for the Yadavas but also for the Kurus. Pandava Bhima killed him in a mace dual aided by the intelligence of Vasudeva Krishna.

Thus, Yudhishthira, the Pandava King, could complete his campaign of bringing the whole of India into his empire. Jarasandha had friendly relations with Chedi king Shishupala, Kuru king Duryodhana and Anga king Karna. His descendants, according to the Vayu Purana, ruled Magadha for 1000 years followed by the Pradyota dynasty, which ruled for 138 years from 799 to 684 BCE. However, there is insufficient evidence to prove the historicity of this claim. These rulers are nonetheless mentioned in the Hindu, Buddhist, and Jain texts. Palaka, the son of the Avanti king Pradyota, conquered Kaushambi, increasing the kingdom's power.

Mahajanapadas 

In the later Vedic Age, a number of small kingdoms or city states, dominated Magadha. Many of these states have been mentioned in Buddhist and Jaina literature as far back as 1000 BCE. By 500 BCE, sixteen monarchies and 'republics' known as the Mahajanapadas —Kasi, Kosala, Anga, Magadha, Vajji (or Vriji), Malla, Chedi, Vatsa (or Vamsa), Kuru, Panchala, Matsya (or Maccha), Surasena, Assaka, Avanti, Gandhara and Kamboja— stretched across the Indo-Gangetic plains from modern-day Afghanistan to Bengal and Maharashtra. Vajji covered the modern North Bihar, Magadha covered South-western Bihar while Anga covered South-eastern Bihar. Many of the sixteen kingdoms had coalesced to four major ones by 500/400 BCE, that is by the time of Siddhartha Gautama. These four were Vatsa, Avanti, Kosala and Magadha. In 537 BCE, Siddhartha Gautama attained the state of "enlightenment" in Bodh Gaya, Bihar. Around the same time, Mahavira who was born in a place called Kundalagrama in the ancient kingdom of Lachuar in Jamui District in modern-day Bihar. He was the 24th Jain Tirthankara, propagated a similar theology, that was to later become Jainism. However, Jain orthodoxy believes it predates all known time. The Vedas are believed to have documented a few Jain Tirthankaras and an ascetic order similar to the sramana movement. The Buddha's teachings and Jainism had doctrines inclined toward asceticism, and were preached in Prakrit, which helped them gain acceptance amongst the masses. They have profoundly influenced practices that Hinduism and Indian spiritual orders are associated with namely, vegetarianism, prohibition of animal slaughter and ahimsa (non-violence).

While the geographic impact of Jainism was limited to India, Buddhist nuns and monks eventually spread the teachings of Buddha to Central Asia, East Asia, Tibet, Sri Lanka and South East Asia. Nalanda University and Vikramshila University one of the oldest residential universities were established in Bihar during this period.

Early Magadha Empire 

According to both Buddhist texts and Jain texts, one of Pradyota tradition was that king's son would kill his father to become the successor. During this time, it is reported that there was high crimes in Magadha. The people rose up and elected Shishunaga to become the new king, who destroyed the power of the Pradyotas and created the Shishunaga dynasty. Shishunaga (also called King Sisunaka) was the founder of a dynasty collectively called the Shishunaga dynasty. He established the Magadha empire (in 684 BCE). Due in part to this bloody dynastic feuding, it is thought that a civil revolt led to the emergence of the Shishunaga dynasty. This empire, with its original capital in Rajgriha, later shifted to Pataliputra (both currently in the Indian state of Bihar). The Shishunaga dynasty was one of the largest empires of the Indian subcontinent.

The Hariyanka dynasty king Bimbisara was responsible for expanding the boundaries of his kingdom through matrimonial alliances and conquest. The land of Kosala fell to Magadha in this way. Estimates place the territory ruled by this early dynasty at 300 leagues in diameter, and encompassing 80,000 small settlements. Bimbisara is contemporary with the Buddha, and is recorded as a lay disciple. Bimbisara (543–493 BCE) was imprisoned and killed by his own son who became his successor, Ajatashatru (491–461 BCE), under whose rule, the dynasty reached its largest extent.

Licchavi was an ancient—before the birth of Mahavira— republic in what is now the Bihar state of India. Vaishali was the capital of Licchavi and the Vajjika League. The Mahavamsa tells that a courtesan in that city, Ambapali, was famous for her beauty, and helped in large measure in making the city prosperous.

Ajatashatru went to war with the Licchavi several times. Ajatashatru is thought to have ruled from 551 BCE to 519 BCE and moved the capital of the Magadha kingdom from Rajagriha to Pataliputra. The Mahavamsa tells that Udayabhadra eventually succeeded his father, Ajatashatru, and that under him Pataliputra became the largest city in the world. He is thought to have ruled for sixteen years. The kingdom had a particularly bloody succession. Anuruddha eventually succeeded Udaybhadra through assassination, and his son Munda succeeded him in the same fashion, as did his son Nagadasaka.

This dynasty lasted until 424 BCE, when it was overthrown by the Nanda dynasty. This period saw the development in Magadha of two of India's major religions. Gautama Buddha in the 6th or 5th century BCE was the founder of Buddhism, which later spread to East Asia and Southeast Asia, while Mahavira revived and propagated the ancient sramanic religion of Jainism.

The Nanda dynasty was established by an illegitimate son of King Mahanandin from the previous Shishunaga dynasty. The Nanda dynasty ruled Magadha during the 5th and 4th centuries BC. At its greatest extent, the Nanda Empire extended from Burma in the east, Balochistan in the west and probably as far south as Karnataka. Mahapadma Nanda of Nanda dynasty, has been described as the destroyer of all the Kshatriyas. He defeated the Ikshvaku dynasty, as well as the Panchalas, Kasis, Haihayas, Kalingas, Asmakas, Kurus, Maithilas, Surasenas and the Vitihotras. He expanded his territory to the south of Deccan. Mahapadma Nanda died at the age of 88 and, therefore, he ruled during most of the period of this dynasty, which lasted 100 years.

In 321 BC, exiled general Chandragupta Maurya, with the help of Chanakya, founded the Maurya dynasty after overthrowing the reigning Nanda king Dhana Nanda to establish the Maurya Empire. The Maurya Empire (322–185 BC), ruled by the Mauryan dynasty, was geographically extensive, powerful and a political-military empire in ancient India. During this time, most of the subcontinent was united under a single government for the first time. The exceptions were present day Tamil Nadu and Kerala (which was a Tamil kingdom at that time). The empire had its capital city at Pataliputra (near modern Patna). The Mauryan empire under Chandragupta Maurya would not only conquer most of the Indian subcontinent, defeating and conquering the satraps left by Alexander the Great, but also push its boundaries into Persia and Central Asia, conquering the Gandhara region. Chandragupta Maurya then defeated an invasion led by Seleucus I, a Greek general from Alexander's army. Chandragupta Maurya's minister, Kautilya Chanakya, wrote the Arthashastra, a treatise on economics, politics, foreign affairs, administration, military arts, war and religion.

Chandragupta Maurya was succeeded by his son, Bindusara, who expanded the kingdom over most of present-day India, other than the extreme south and east. At its greatest extent, the Empire stretched to the north along the natural boundaries of the Himalayas, and to the east stretching into what is now Assam. To the west, it reached beyond modern Pakistan, annexing Balochistan and much of what is now Afghanistan. The Empire was extended into India's central and southern regions by the emperors Chandragupta and Bindusara, but it excluded the republic of Kalinga.

The Maurya Empire was inherited by Bindusara's son, Ashoka. Ashoka initially sought to expand his kingdom but in the aftermath of the carnage caused during the invasion of Kalinga, he renounced bloodshed and pursued a policy of non-violence or ahimsa after converting to Buddhism. Following the conquest of Kalinga, Ashoka ended the military expansion of the empire, and led the empire through more than 40 years of relative peace, harmony and prosperity. Ashoka's response to the Kalinga War is recorded in the Edicts of Ashoka, one of the oldest preserved historical documents of the Indian subcontinent.

According to Rock Edicts of Ashoka: 
The Mauryan Empire under Ashoka was responsible for the proliferation of Buddhist ideals across the whole of East Asia and South-East Asia. Under Ashoka, India was a prosperous and stable empire of great economic and military power whose political influence and trade extended across Asia and into Europe. Chandragupta Maurya's embrace of Jainism increased social and religious renewal and reform across his society, while Ashoka embraced Buddhism. Ashoka sponsored the spreading of Buddhist ideals into Sri Lanka and South-East Asia. The Lion Capital of Ashoka at Sarnath, is the emblem of India. Archaeologically, the period of Mauryan rule in South Asia falls into the era of Northern Black Polished Ware (NBPW). The Arthashastra, the Edicts of Ashoka and Ashokavadana are primary sources of written records of the Mauryan times.

Ashoka was followed for 50 years by a succession of weaker kings. Brihadrata, the last ruler of the Mauryan dynasty, held territories that had shrunk considerably from the time of emperor Ashoka, although he still upheld the Buddhist faith.

Middle Kingdoms (230 BC – 1206 AD)

Shunga Dynasty 
The Shunga dynasty was established in 185 BC, about fifty years after Ashoka's death, when the king Brihadratha, the last of the Mauryan rulers, was assassinated by the then commander-in-chief of the Mauryan armed forces, Pushyamitra Shunga.

Pushyamitra Shunga was a Brahmin who then took over the throne and established the Shunga dynasty. Buddhist records such as the Ashokavadana write that the assassination of Brihadrata and the rise of the Shunga empire led to a wave of persecution of Buddhists, and a resurgence of Hinduism. According to John Marshall, Pushyamitra Shunga may have been the main author of the persecutions, although later Shunga kings seem to have been more supportive of Buddhism. Other historians, such as Etienne Lamotte and Romila Thapar, partially support this view.

Gupta Dynasty 
The Gupta dynasty ruled from around 240 to 550 CE. The origins of the Gupta Dynasty are shrouded in obscurity. The Chinese traveller Xuanzang provides the first evidence of the Gupta kingdom in Magadha. He came to India in 672 CE and heard of 'Maharaja Sri-Gupta' who built a temple for Chinese pilgrims near Mrigasikhavana. Ghatotkacha (c. 280–319) CE, had a son named Chandra Gupta I (Not to be confused with Chandragupta Maurya (340–293 BC), founder of the Mauryan Empire). In a breakthrough deal, Chandra Gupta I was married to a woman from Lichchhavi—the main power in Magadha.

Samudragupta succeeded Chandra Gupta I in 335, and ruled for about 45 years, until his death in 380. He attacked the kingdoms of Shichchhatra, Padmavati, Malwas, the Yaudheyas, the Arjunayanas, the Maduras and the Abhiras, and merged them in his kingdom. By his death in 380, he had incorporated over twenty kingdoms into his realm, his rule extended from the Himalayas to the river Narmada and from the Brahmaputra to the Yamuna. He gave himself the titles King of Kings and World Monarch. He is considered the Napoleon of India. Chandra Gupta I performed Ashwamedha Yajna to underline the importance of his conquest.

Chandra Gupta II, the Sun of Power (Vikramaditya), ruled from 380 until 413. Only marginally less successful than his father, Chandra Gupta II expanded his realm westwards, defeating the Saka Western Kshatrapas of Malwa, Gujarat and Saurashtra in a campaign lasting until 409. Chandragupta II was succeeded by his son Kumaragupta I. Known as the Mahendraditya, he ruled until 455. Towards the end of his reign a tribe in the Narmada valley, the Pushyamitras, rose in power to threaten the empire.

Skandagupta is generally considered the last of the great rulers. He defeated the Pushyamitra threat, but then was faced with invading Hephthalites or Huna, from the northwest. He repulsed a Huna attack c. 477. Skandagupta died in 487 and was succeeded by his son Narasimhagupta Baladitya.

The Gupta Empire was one of the largest political and military empires in ancient India. The Gupta period is referred to as the Classical age of India by most historians. The time of the Gupta Empire was an "Indian Golden Age" in Indian science, technology, engineering, art, dialectic, literature, logic, mathematics, astronomy, religion and philosophy.

The Gupta Empire had their capital at Pataliputra. The difference between Gupta Empire's and Mauryan Empire's administration was that in the Mauryan administration power was centralised but in the Gupta administration power was more decentralised. The empire was divided into provinces and the provinces were further divided into districts. Villages were the smallest units. The kingdom covered Gujarat, North-East India, south-eastern Pakistan, Odisha, northern Madhya Pradesh and eastern India with capital at Pataliputra, modern Patna. All forms of worship were carried out in Sanskrit.

Rapid strides were made in astronomy during this period. Aryabhata and Varahamihira were two great astronomers and mathematicians. Aryabhata stated that the earth moved round the sun and rotated on its own axis. Aryabhata, who is believed to be the first to come up with the concept of zero, postulated the theory that the Earth moves round the Sun, and studied solar and lunar eclipses. Aryabhata's most famous work was Aryabhatiya. Varahamihira's most important contributions are the encyclopaedic Brihat-Samhita and Pancha-Siddhantika. Metallurgy also made rapid strides. The proof can be seen in the Iron Pillar of Vaishali and near Mehrauli on the outskirts of Delhi, which was brought from Bihar.

This period is also very rich in Sanskrit literature. The material sources of this age were Kalidasa's works. Raghuvamsa, Malavikagnimitram, Meghadūta, Abhijñānaśākuntala and Kumārasambhava, Mrichchakatika by Shudraka, Panchatantra by Vishnu Sharma, Kama Sutra (the principles of pleasure) and 13 plays by Bhasa were also written in this period.

In medicine, the Guptas were notable for their establishment and patronage of free hospitals. Although progress in physiology and biology was hindered by religious injunctions against contact with dead bodies, which discouraged dissection and anatomy, Indian physicians excelled in pharmacopoeia, caesarean section, bone setting, and skin grafting. Indeed, Hindu medical advances were soon adopted in the Arab and Western worlds. Ayurveda was the main medical system.

According to some historian's work,

Later Gupta dynasty

The Later Gupta dynasty ruled the Magadha region in eastern India between the 6th and 7th centuries CE. The Later Guptas succeeded the imperial Guptas as the rulers of Magadha, but there is no evidence connecting the two dynasties; these appear to be two distinct families. The Later Guptas are so-called because the names of their rulers ended with the suffix "-gupta", which they might have adopted to portray themselves as the legitimate successors of the imperial Guptas.

Pala Dynasty 
The Pala Empire was a Buddhist dynasty that ruled from the Bengal region of the Indian subcontinent. The name Pala (Modern  pal) means protector and was used as an ending to the names of all Pala monarchs. The Palas were followers of the Mahayana and Tantric schools of Buddhism. Gopala was the first ruler from the dynasty. He came to power in 750 in Gaur by a democratic election. This event is recognised as one of the first democratic elections in South Asia since the time of the Mahā Janapadas. He reigned from 750 to 770 and consolidated his position by extending his control over all of Bengal as well as parts of Bihar. The Buddhist dynasty lasted for four centuries (750-1120 CE).

The empire reached its peak under Dharmapala and Devapala. Dharmapala extended the empire into the northern parts of the Indian Subcontinent. This triggered once again the power struggle for the control of the subcontinent. Devapala, successor of Dharmapala, expanded the empire to cover much of South Asia and beyond. His empire stretched from Assam and Utkala in the east, Kamboja (modern day Afghanistan) in the north-west and Deccan in the south. According to Pala copperplate inscription, Devapala exterminated the Utkalas, conquered the Pragjyotisha (Assam), shattered the pride of the Huna, and humbled the lords of Pratiharas, Gurjara and the Dravidas.

The Palas created many temples and works of art as well as supported the Universities of Nalanda and Vikramashila. Both Nalanda University and Vikramshila University reached their peak under the Palas. The universities received an influx of students from many parts of the world. Bihar and Bengal were invaded by the south Indian Emperor Rajendra Chola I of the Chola dynasty in the 11th century. The Pala Empire eventually disintegrated in the 12th century under the attack of the Sena dynasty. Pala Empire was the last empire of middle kingdoms whose capital was once in Pataliputra (modern Patna) under Devapala's rule.

Medieval Period (1206–1526) 

Bihar was largely in ruins when visited by Xuanzang, the famous Buddhist monk from China, and suffered further damage at the hands of Muslim raiders in the 12th century. With the advent of the foreign aggression and eventual foreign subjugation of India, Bihar passed through very uncertain times during the medieval period. Muhammad of Ghor attacked this region of the Indian subcontinent many times. Muhammad of Ghor's armies destroyed many Buddhist structures, including the great Nalanda university.

The Buddhism of Magadha was finally swept away by the Islamic invasion under Muhammad Bin Bakhtiar Khilji, one of Qutb-ud-Din's generals destroyed monasteries fortified by the Sena armies, during which many of the viharas and the famed universities of Nalanda and Vikramshila were destroyed, and thousands of Buddhist monks were massacred in the 12th century.

Karnat dynasty

In 1097 CE, the Karnat dynasty of Mithila emerged on the Bihar/Nepal border area and maintained capitals in Darbhanga and Simraongadh. The dynasty was established by Nanyadeva, a military commander of Karnataka-origin. Under this dynasty, the Maithili language started to develop with the first piece of Maithili literature, the Varna Ratnakara being produced in the 14th century by Jyotirishwar Thakur. The Karnats also carried out raids into Nepal. They fell in 1324 following the invasion of Ghiyasuddin Tughlaq.

Pithipatis

During the late Pala-period, the area of Magadha was ruled by Buddhist kings with the title of Pīṭhīpati. They were patrons of the Mahabodhi temple and referred to themselves as magadhādipati (rulers of Magadha). They maintained a presence in the region until at least the 13th century.

Oiniwar dynasty

The Oiniwar dynasty emerged after the fall of the Karnats and ruled North Bihar as vassals of the Delhi Sultanate. Under the king, Shiva Singh, they did attempt to revolt against the throne in Delhi although this was eventually defeated. They were contemporaries of the Jaunpur Sultanate.

Chero dynasty

After fall of Pala empire, the Cheros established a tribal polity that ruled some parts of southern Bihar extending into modern-day Jharkhand from the 12th century to the 16th century until Mughal rule after which they were reduced to chieftains/Zamindars.

Khayaravala dynasty

The Khayaravalas were the ruling dynasty of the Son river valley in South Bihar and Jharkhand during the 11th to 13th centuries. Notable kings of this dynasty include Pratapdhavala and Shri Pratapa. They were also involved in the construction of Rohtasgarh fort.

Early modern period (1526–1757)

Sur Empire 

Medieval Bihar saw a period of glory lasting about six years during the rule of Sher Shah Suri, who hailed from Sasaram. Sher Shah Suri built the longest road of the Indian subcontinent, the Grand Trunk Road, which started at Calcutta (Bengal) and ended at Peshawar, now Pakistan. The economic reforms carried out by Sher Shah, such as the introduction of the Rupee and Custom Duties, are still used in the Republic of India. He revived the city of Patna, where he built his headquarters.

Hemu, the Hindu Emperor, the son of a food seller, and himself a vendor of saltpetre at Rewari, rose to become Chief of Army and Prime Minister under the command of Adil Shah Suri of the Suri Dynasty. He had won 22 battles against the Afghans, from Punjab to Bengal and had defeated Akbar's forces twice, at Agra and Delhi in 1556, before succeeding to the throne of Delhi and establishing a 'Hindu Raj' in North India, albeit for a short duration, from Purana Quila in Delhi. He was killed in the Second Battle of Panipat.

Zamindars of Bihar and the Mughals 

During the period of Islamic rule, much of Bihar was under the sway of local Zamindars or chieftains who maintained their own armies and territories. These chieftains retained much of their power until the arrival of the British East India Company.

In 1576, after the Battle of Tukaroi, Mughal Emperor Akbar conquered Bengal Sultanate and added it to his empire domain. He divided Bihar and Bengal each into one of his original twelve subahs (imperial top-level provinces; Bihar with seat at Patna) and the region passed through uneventful provincial rule during much of this period. Bihar was left under Mughal control until the Battle of Plassey in 1757.
 
Bihar passed into the control of Nawabs of Bengal under British suzerainty.

Prince Azim-us-Shan, the grandson of Aurangzeb was appointed as the governor of Bihar in 1703. Azim-us-Shan renamed Pataliputra or Patna as Azimabad, in 1704.

Colonial Period (1757–1947)

British East India Company 

After the Battle of Buxar, 1764, which was fought in Buxar, hardly 115 km from Patna, the Mughals as well as the Nawabs of Bengal lost effective control over the territories then constituting the province of Bengal, which currently comprises Bangladesh and the Indian states of West Bengal, Bihar, Jharkhand, Odisha. The British East India Company was accorded the diwani rights, that is, the right to administer the collection and management of revenues of the province of Bengal, and parts of Oudh, currently comprising a large part of Uttar Pradesh. The diwani rights were legally granted by Shah Alam, who was then the sovereign Mughal emperor of India. During the rule of the British East India Company in Bihar, Patna emerged as one of the most important commercial and trading centres of eastern India, preceded only by Kolkata.

The first seeds of resentment against British rule emerged when Maharaja Fateh Bahadur Sahi, the chieftain of Huseypur  in Saran district, initiated a struggle against the East India company in 1767. His revolt escalated in 1781 when various other zamindars and chiefs in South Bihar began to join his revolt including Raja Narain Singh and Akbar Ali. The British were able to successfully put down the revolt.

Babu Kunwar Singh of Jagdishpur and his army, as well as countless other persons from Bihar, contributed to the India's First War of Independence (1857), also called the Sepoy Mutiny by some historians. Babu Kunwar Singh (1777–1858) one of the leaders of the Indian uprising of 1857 belonged to a royal Rajput house of Jagdispur, currently a part of Bhojpur district of Bihar. By that time Bihar had many feudal estates or zamindars. Most notably Tekari Raj, Raj Darbhanga, Bettiah Raj, Hathwa Raj, Kharagpur Raj and Banaili Estate. At the age of 80 years, during India's First War of Independence, he actively led a select band of armed soldiers against the troops under the command of the East India Company, and also recorded victories in many battles.

The British Raj 
Under the British Raj, Bihar particularly Patna gradually started to attain its lost glory and emerged as an important and strategic centre of learning and trade in India. From this point, Bihar remained a part the Bengal Presidency of the British Raj until 1912, when the province of Bihar and Orissa was carved out as a separate province. When the Bengal Presidency was partitioned in 1912 to carve out a separate province, Patna was made the capital of the new province. The city limits were stretched westwards to accommodate the administrative base, and the township of Bankipore took shape along the Bailey Road (originally spelt as Bayley Road, after the first Lt. Governor, Charles Stuart Bayley). This area was called the New Capital Area. The houses of the English residents, were all at the west-end at Bankipore. The greater part of the English residences were on the banks of the river, many of them being on the northern side of an open square, which formed the parade ground, and racecourse (present Gandhi Maidan). There was also the Golghar a wondrous bell-shaped building, one hundred feet high, with a winding outer staircase leading to the top, and a small entrance door at the base, which was intended for a granary, to be filled when there was the expectation of famine. It was initially considered to be both politically and materially impracticable.

To this day, locals call the old area as the City whereas the new area is called the New Capital Area. The Patna Secretariat with its imposing clock tower and the Patna High Court are two imposing landmarks of this era of development. Credit for designing the massive and majestic buildings of colonial Patna goes to the architect, I. F. Munnings. By 1916–1917, most of the buildings were ready for occupation. These buildings reflect either Indo-Saracenic influence (like Patna Museum and the state Assembly), or overt Renaissance influence like the Raj Bhawan and the High Court. Some buildings, like the General Post Office (GPO) and the Old Secretariat bear pseudo-Renaissance influence. Some say, the experience gained in building the new capital area of Patna proved very useful in building the imperial capital of New Delhi.

The British built several educational institutions in Patna like Patna College, Patna Science College, Bihar College of Engineering, Prince of Wales Medical College and the Bihar Veterinary College. With government patronage, the Biharis quickly seized the opportunity to make these centres flourish quickly and attain renown. In 1935, certain portions of Bihar were reorganised into the separate province of Orissa. Patna continued as the capital of Bihar province under the British Raj.

Independence movement 
Bihar played a major role in the Indian independence struggle. Most notable were the Champaran movement against the Indigo plantation and the Quit India Movement of 1942.

After his return from South Africa, it was from Bihar that Mahatma Gandhi launched his pioneering civil-disobedience movement, Champaran Satyagraha. Raj Kumar Shukla drew Mahatma Gandhi's attention to the exploitation of the peasants by the European indigo planters. Champaran Satyagraha received the spontaneous support from many Biharis, including Brajkishore Prasad, Rajendra Prasad (who became the first President of India) and Anugrah Narayan Sinha (who became the first Deputy Chief Minister and Finance Minister of Bihar).

In India's struggle for independence, the Champaran Satyagraha marks a very important stage. Raj Kumar Shukla drew the attention of Mahatma Gandhi, who had just returned from South Africa, to the plight of the peasants suffering under an oppressive system established by European indigo planters. Besides other excesses they were forced to cultivate indigo on 3/20 part of their holding and sell it to the planters at prices fixed by the planters. This marked Gandhi's entry into the India's independence movement. On arrival at the district headquarters in Motihari, Gandhi and his team of lawyers—Dr. Rajendra Prasad, Dr. Anugrah Narayan Sinha, Brajkishore Prasad and Ram Navami Prasad, who he had handpicked to participate in the satyagraha—were ordered to leave by the next available train. They refused to do this, and Gandhi was arrested. He was released and the ban order was withdrawn in the face of a "Satyagraha" threat. Gandhi conducted an open inquiry into the peasant's grievances. The Government had to appoint an inquiry committee with Gandhi as a member. This led to the abolition of the system.

Raj Kumar Shukla has been described by Gandhi in his Atmakatha, as a man whose suffering gave him the strength to rise against the odds. In his letter to Gandhi he wrote "Respected Mahatma, You hear the stories of others everyday. Today please listen to my story.... I want to draw your attention to the promise made by you in the Lucknow Congress that you would come to Champaran. The time has come for you to fulfill your promise. 1.9 million suffering people of Champaran are waiting to see you."

Gandhi reached Patna on 10 April 1917 and on 16 April he reached Motihari accompanied by Raj Kumar Shukla. Under Gandhi's leadership the historic "Champaran Satyagraha" began. The contribution of Raj Kumar Shukla is reflected in the writings of Dr. Rajendra Prasad, first President of India, Anugrah Narayan Sinha, Acharya Kriplani and Mahatma Gandhi. Raj Kumar Shukla maintained a diary in which he gave an account of struggle against the atrocities of the indigo planters, atrocities so movingly depicted by Dinabandhu Mitra in Nil Darpan, a play that was translated by Michael Madhusudan Dutt. This movement by Mahatma Gandhi received the spontaneous support of a cross section of people, including Dr. Rajendra Prasad, Bihar Kesari Sri Krishna Sinha, Dr. Anugrah Narayan Sinha and Brajkishore Prasad.

Shaheed Baikuntha Shukla was another nationalist from Bihar, who was hanged for murdering a government approver named Phanindrananth Ghosh. This led to the hanging of Bhagat Singh, Sukhdev and Rajguru. Phanindranath Ghosh hitherto a key member of the Revolutionary Party had betrayed the cause by turning an approver and giving evidence, which led to his murder. Baikunth was commissioned to plan the murder of Ghosh. He carried out the killing successfully on 9 November 1932. He was arrested, tried, convicted, and, on 14 May 1934, he was hanged in Gaya Central Jail.

In North and Central Bihar, a peasant movement was an important side effect of the independence movement. The Kisan Sabha movement started in Bihar under the leadership of Swami Sahajanand Saraswati who in 1929 had formed the Bihar Provincial Kisan Sabha (BPKS) to mobilise peasant grievances against the zamindari attacks on their occupancy rights. Gradually the peasant movement intensified and spread across the rest of India. All these radical developments on the peasant front culminated in the formation of the All India Kisan Sabha (AIKS) at the Lucknow session of the Indian National Congress in April 1936, with Swami Sahajanand Saraswati elected as its first President. This movement aimed at overthrowing the feudal zamindari system instituted by the British. It was led by Swami Sahajanand Saraswati and his followers Pandit Yamuna Karjee, Rahul Sankrityayan and others. Pandit Yamuna Karjee along with Rahul Sankrityayan and other Hindi literary figures started publishing a Hindi weekly Hunkar from Bihar in 1940. Hunkar later became the mouthpiece of the peasant movement and the agrarian movement in Bihar and was instrumental in spreading the movement. The peasant movement later spread to other parts of the country and helped in digging out the British roots in the Indian society by overthrowing the zamindari system.

Bihar's contribution in the independence movement has been immense with famous leaders like Swami Sahajanand Saraswati, Shaheed Baikuntha Shukla, Sri Krishna Sinha, Anugrah Narayan Sinha, Mulana Mazharul Haque, Loknayak Jayaprakash Narayan, Basawon Singh (Sinha), Yogendra Shukla, Sheel Bhadra Yajee, Pandit Yamuna Karjee, Dr. Maghfoor Ahmad Ajazi and many others who worked for India's independence and worked to lift up the underprivileged masses. Khudiram Bose, Upendra Narayan Jha "Azad" and Prafulla Chaki were also active in revolutionary movement in Bihar.

Towards the end of 1946, between 30 October and 7 November, a massacre of Muslims in Bihar made Partition more likely. Begun as a reprisal for the Noakhali riot, it was difficult for authorities to deal with because it was spread out over a large number of scattered villages, and the number of casualties was impossible to establish accurately: "According to a subsequent statement in the British Parliament, the death-toll amounted to 5,000. The Statesman'''s estimate was between 7,500 and 10,000; the Congress party admitted to 2,000; Mr. Jinnah claimed about 30,000."

The first Cabinet of Bihar was formed on 2 April 1946, consisting of two members, Dr. Sri Krishna Sinha as the first Chief Minister of Bihar and Dr. Anugrah Narayan Sinha as Deputy Chief Minister and Finance Minister of Bihar (also in charge of Labour, Health, Agriculture and Irrigation). Other ministers were inducted later. The Cabinet served as the first Bihar Government after independence in 1947. In 1950, Dr. Rajendra Prasad from Bihar became the first President of India.

 Post Independence (1947–1990) 

The Indian National Congress dominated the state for much of the decades after independence except for a brief period of time in the 1960s and 70s, when some of the backward caste leaders were successful in forming non-Congress government in the state. Satish Prasad Singh was the first OBC chief minister of the state for a very brief period of time, who succeeded Mahamaya Prasad Sinha. In the later period, the upper-caste remained active in politics but the backward caste were gradually becoming vocal in political space. The lead was taken by Upper Backward Castes, who were the biggest beneficiaries of the land reform drive undertaken in the early decades of independence and were now becoming active in politics of the state. A section of these upper-backwards also emulated the practices of erstwhile Zamindars and committed atrocities against the Dalits. The Naxalite uprising in the state also forced the upper-caste to sell off their most vulnerable holdings, which were most often bought by the peasants of these upper backward communities. The naxal uprising in the state led to foundation of several caste based private armies which perpetrated massacres of lower caste people on the charge of being the supporters of the naxalites. Ranvir Sena, Bhumi Sena and Kuer Sena were some of the most dreaded caste armies. The Bhojpur region remained the hotspot of the naxalite movement in the Bihar, where Master Jagdish lead the uprising against the landlords. Some of the biggest massacres took place during this time period in which both upper-caste and the Dalits remained the victims. The Upper Backward Castes were in two front confrontation with both the Dalits as well as upper-castes.

The caste wars coincided with the rise of backward caste politics against upper-caste domination in Bihar and throughout North India after the implementation of the Mandal Commission report. The most numerous and powerful backward community were the Yadavs, and the 1990s saw the rise of the Rashtriya Janata Dal (RJD) led by Lalu Prasad Yadav. This party held the Yadav/Muslim votebank, a combination also held by the Samajwadi party, its UP counterpart. This allowed the RJD to sweep to power throughout the 1990s. His platform was one of social justice, increasing reservations for lower castes. However critics of the era have claimed it was a 'Jungle raj.'

Recent 1990
 Lalu–Rabri Yadav (1990–2005) 

In 1989, in the 9th General election to the Lok Sabha, the Janata Dal emerged as a serious challenge to the Indian National Congress party at the central level. The rise of Janata Dal also affected the state politics of Bihar which was dominated by the upper castes for long who were controlling the Congress firmly in the state, a charge disputed by some scholars. The Janata Dal was composed of the three different wings which drew its strength from different classes of society. The first wing was under the leadership of Chandra Shekhar, who had reached out to the other Socialists and also to one splinter group under Morarji Desai. The second faction consisted of some of the old congressmen including Arun Nehru and former Defence Minister Vishwanath Pratap Singh. The third group drew its support from backward castes and middle peasantry, led by Charan Singh. Although Charan Singh was leader of this faction, the actual leadership emerged after his death under the new generation of politicians like Lalu Prasad Yadav, who was a product of student politics of the 1970s.

Yadav was appointed as first OBC president of Patna University student union in 1967. In 1974, he was appointed as the head of the Bihar student agitation committee which led the protest against Congress led government of state during the Bihar Movement under the mentorship of Jay Prakash Narayan. According to Seyed Hossein Zarhani, throughout his leadership period in Patna University, his image was of a popular backward caste leader who fought against upper-caste dominance.

In 1975, as an activist of the campaign against Indira Gandhi, he was arrested and after the end of National Emergency, he was elected as Member of Parliament in 1977 from Chhapra constituency on the ticket of Janata Party. In 1980 and 1989 state assembly elections, Yadav was elected as Member of Legislative Assembly from Sonepur. He was the successor of Karpoori Thakur as the leader of opposition in Bihar Legislative Assembly who finally assumed the post of Chief Minister in 1990. Yadav's appointment as Chief Minister changed the socio-political profile of the state and in the coming years he emerged as undisputed leader in the Bihar who controlled the politics of the state earlier himself and later through his wife, Rabri Devi.

Yadav followed the footsteps of his predecessors and Janta Dal under him indicated that it is the only party which is prepared to keep the backwards at the centre of the administration. Hence after assuming power, Lalu Yadav's government transferred 12 out of 13 Divisional Commissioners and 250 out of 324 Returning Officers in order to keep lower-caste people at the helm of all affairs at the local level. Many OBC bureaucrats were brought to the main departments from the sidelines and were given key position such as the strategic posts of District Magistrates and Deputy Divisional Commissioners to the extent that they became at least equivalent to the upper-castes. Three years after Yadav assumed power, many upper-caste officials attained transfer to the centre to avoid the alleged humiliation and ill-treatment they suffered in Bihar. The Panchayati Raj Bill and the Patna University and Bihar University amendment bill passed by state legislature in 1993 also paved the way for the entry of Scheduled Castes, Scheduled Tribes and OBCs in the state services in bulk. According to Christophe Jaffrelot:

 Rise of Nitish Kumar (Post 1997) 

The Janata Dal had survived the splits in past when leaders like George Fernandes and Nitish Kumar defected to form Samata Party in 1994, but it remained a baseless party after the decision of Yadav to form Rashtriya Janata Dal in 1997. The second split took place prior to the Rabri Devi assuming power which resulted in Janata Dal having only two leader of any consequence in it, namely Sharad Yadav and Ram Vilas Paswan. Paswan was regarded as the rising leader of Dalits and had the credit of winning his elections with unprecedented margins. His popularity reached to the national level when he was awarded the post of Minister of Railways in the United Front government in 1996 and was subsequently made the leader of Lok Sabha. His outreach was witnessed in the western Uttar Pradesh too, when his followers organised an impressive rally at the behest of a newly floated organisation called Dalit Panthers. Sharad Yadav was also a veteran socialist leader but without any massive support base. In 1998 Parliamentary elections, Samata Party and Janata Dal, which was in a much weaker position after formation of RJD ended up eating each other's vote base. This made Nitish Kumar merge both the parties to form Janata Dal (United).

In 1999, Lok Sabha elections Rashtriya Janata Dal received a setback at the hand of BJP+JD(U) combine. The new coalition emerged leading in 199 out of 324 assembly constituency and it was widely believed that in the forthcoming election to Bihar state assembly elections, the Lalu-Rabri rule will come to an end. The RJD had fought the election in an alliance with the Congress but the coalition didn't work making state leadership of Congress believe that the maligned image of Lalu Prasad after his name was drawn in the Fodder Scam had eroded his support base. Consequently, the Congress decided to fight the 2000 assembly elections alone. The RJD had to be satiated with the communist parties as the coalition partners but the seat sharing conundrum in the camp of NDA made Nitish Kumar pull his Samta Party out of the Sharad Yadav and Ram Vilas Paswan faction of the Janata Dal. Differences also arose between the BJP and Nitish Kumar as the later wanted to be projected as the Chief Minister of Bihar but the former was not in favour. Even Paswan also wanted to be a CM face. The Muslims and OBCs were too divided in their opinion. A section of Muslims, which included the poor communities like Pasmanda were of the view that Lalu only strengthened upper Muslims like Shaikh, Sayyid and Pathans and they were in search of new options.

Yadav also alienated other dominant backward castes like Koeri and Kurmi since his projection as the saviour of Muslims. It is argued by Sanjay Kumar that the belief that, "the dominant OBCs like the twin caste of Koeri-Kurmi will ask for share in power if he (Yadav) seeks their support while the Muslims will remain satisfied with the protection during communal riots only" made Yadav neglect them. Moreover, the divisions in both the camps made the political atmosphere in the state a charged one in which many parties were fighting against each other with no visible frontiers. JD(U) and BJP were fighting against each other on some of the seats and so was the Samta Party. The result was a setback for the BJP, which in media campaigns was emerging with massive victory. RJD emerged as the single largest party and with the political maneuvere of Lalu Yadav, Rabri Devi was sworn in as the Chief Minister again. The media largely failed to gauge the ground level polarisation in Bihar. According to Sanjay Kumar:

Even after serving imprisonment in connection with the 1997 scam, Lalu seemed to relish his role as lower-caste jester. He argued that corruption charges against him and his family were the conspiracy of the upper-caste bureaucracy and media elites threatened by the rise of peasant cultivator castes. In 2004, Lalu's RJD had outperformed other state based parties by winning 26 Lok Sabha seats in Bihar. He was awarded with the post of Union Railway minister but the rising aspirations of the extremely backward castes unleashed by him resulted in JD(U) and BJP led coalition to defeat his party in 2005 Bihar Assembly elections. Consequently, Nitish Kumar a leader of OBC Kurmi caste was sworn in as the chief minister. During Lalu's time backward caste candidates came to dominate Bihar assembly claiming half of the seats in it and it was the aspiration of this powerful social community which led to fricton among the united backwards, leading to the rise of Nitish Kumar who made both social justice and development as his political theme.

 Nitish Kumar (2005 onwards) 
Thus, the 2005 Bihar assembly elections ended the 15 years of continuous RJD rule in the state, giving way to NDA led by Nitish Kumar. Bihari migrant workers have faced violence and prejudice in many parts of India, like Maharashtra, Punjab and Assam.

To mark the separation of Bihar from Bengal on 22 March 1912, the completion of 100 years of existence is being celebrated in the name of Bihar Shatabadi Celebration Utsav. There was a political crisis over post of the chief minister during February 2015.

 Timeline for Bihar 

 Gallery 

 See also 

 History of India
 History of Bengal
 History of Tamil Nadu
 Political history of medieval Karnataka

 References 

 Further reading 
 Swami Sahajanand Saraswati Rachnawali (Selected works of Swami Sahajanand Saraswati) in Six volumes published by Prakashan Sansthan, Delhi, 2003.
 Swami Sahajanand and the Peasants of Jharkhand: A View from 1941 translated and edited by Walter Hauser along with the unedited Hindi original (Manohar Publishers, paperback, 2005).
 Sahajanand on Agricultural Labour and the Rural Poor translated and edited by Walter Hauser (Manohar Publishers, paperback, 2005).
 Religion, Politics, and the Peasants: A Memoir of India's Freedom Movement translated and edited by Walter Hauser (Manohar Publishers, hardbound, 2003).
 Pandit Yadunandan (Jadunandan) Sharma, 1947, Bakasht Mahamari Aur Uska Achook Ilaaz (Bakasht Epidemic and its Infalliable Remedy) in Hindi, Allahabad.
 Indradeep Sinha, 1969, Sathi ke Kisanon ka Aitihasic Sangharsha (Historic Struggle of Sathi Peasants), in Hindi, Patna.
 Das Arvind N., The republic of Bihar, Penguin Books, 1992,
 
 Mishra Shree Govind, History Of Bihar 1740-1772, Munshiram Manoharlal, 1970
 Verma B S, Socio-religious Economic And Literary Condition Of Bihar (From ca. 319 A.D. to 1000 A.D.), Munshiram Manoharlal, 1962
 Naipaul V S, India: A Wounded Civilization, Picador, 1977
 Trevithick Alan, The Revival of Buddhist Pilgrimage at Bodh Gaya (1811–1949): Anagarika Dharmapala and the Mahabodhi Temple Omalley L S S, History of Magadh, Veena Publication, 2005, 
 Ahmad Qeyamuddin, Patna Through The Ages: Glimpses of History, Society & Economy, Commonwealth Publishers,1988
 Crindle John W Mc, Ancient India As Described By Ptolemy, Munshiram Manoharlal, 1927, 
 Patra C, Life in Ancient India: As Depicted in the Digha Nikaya, Punthi Pustak, 1996, 
 Hazra Kanai Lal, Buddhism in India As Described by the Chinese Pilgrims AD 399-689, Munshiram Manoharlal, 1983, 
 Mccrindle John W, Ancient India as Described by Megasthenes and Arrian, Munshiram Manoharlal
 Waddell, Austine L., Report on the Excavations at Pataliputra (Patna) - The Palibothra of the Greeks, Asian Publicational Services, Calcutta, 1903
 Brass Paul R., The politics of India since Independence, Cambridge University Press, 1990
 Askari S. H., Medieval Bihar: Sultante and Mughal Period, Khuda Bakhsh Oriental Public Library, Patna, 1990
 Tayler William, Three Months at Patna during the Insurrection of 1857, Khuda Bakhsh Oriental Public Library, Patna, 2007
 Taylor P.J.O., What really happened during the Mutiny: A day by day account of the major events of 1857-1859 in India, Oxford University Press, 1997, 
 Basham A. L., The Wonder that was India, Picador, 1954, 
 Nambisan Vijay, Bihar in the eye of the beholder, Penguin Books, 2000, 
 Radhakanta Barik - Land & Caste Politics in Bihar'' (Shipra Publications, Delhi, 2006)